Myrciaria tenella, commonly known as  or , which are also used to describe Myrciaria cuspidata and Myrciaria delicatula; or more specifically , and , is a species of plant in the family Myrtaceae.

Distribution 
Myrciaria tenella is endemic to Argentina, Bolivia, Brazil, Dominican Republic, French Guiana, Haiti, Paraguay, Peru, Uruguay, and Venezuela.

Description 
Myrciaria tenella is a semi-deciduous shrub or small tree that grows to between 1 and 6 metres tall. The red or orange fruit is edible and up to 15mm in diameter. Each fruit contains one, or sometimes two seeds.

Uses 
Cambuí fruit is an important species in the State of Sergipe, Brazil, where the fruits are harvested and sold for fresh consumption in the local market. The fruits are also used to make juice, jelly and wine.

References

tenella
Crops originating from the Americas
Tropical fruit
Flora of South America
Endemic flora of Brazil
Fruits originating in South America
Cauliflory
Fruit trees
Berries